The surname Eickhoff may refer to:

Anthony Eickhoff, journalist, editor, author, lawyer
Bennet Eickhoff (born 1995), German footballer
Frauke Eickhoff, German judoka
Gottfred Eickhoff, sculptor
Jerad Eickhoff (born 1990), American baseball player

German-language surnames